Marriage Rows is an American Pre-Code 1931 comedy film directed by Fatty Arbuckle.

Cast
 Lloyd Hamilton
 Al St. John
 Addie McPhail
 Doris Deane
 Edna Marion

See also
 Fatty Arbuckle filmography

External links

1931 films
Films directed by Roscoe Arbuckle
1931 comedy films
1931 short films
Educational Pictures short films
American black-and-white films
Films with screenplays by Roscoe Arbuckle
American comedy short films
1930s English-language films
1930s American films